is a Kofun period keyhole-shaped burial mound, located in the Futago neighborhood of the city of Kasugai, Aichi in the Tōkai region of Japan. The tumulus was designated a National Historic Site of Japan in 1936. It is the largest of a cluster of kofun, including the Ajiyoshi Hakusan Jinja Kofun and the Gotosho Kofun, which together with the Ajiyoshi Kasugayama Kofun located about 500 meters to the northwest, forms the Ajiyoshi Kofun Cluster.

Overview
With a length of 96 meters and a height of six meters, it is estimated to have been constructed in the middle of the 6th century AD. The tumulus was constructed in two tiers, and is orientated 30 degrees to the northwest. The tumulus had a structure on the northeast side, possibly a ceremonial platform, and was originally surrounded by  a shield-shaped moat. 

The tumulus was burglarized in a large scale in the Meiji period. Per an archaeological excavation in 1935, a hollow with a diameter of four to five meters was found in the posterior circular portion, which is where the burial chamber was probably located, but no sarcophagus or grave goods could be found. In 1967, a Japan Air Self-Defense Force training aircraft crashed next to the kofun, causing considerable damage. During the restoration work, numerous haniwa were found, some in the forms of horses, people, waterfowl, etc., in addition to the more common cylindrical varieties. Penetration into the interior of the kofun was hampered by seepage of ground water, and subsequent work was suspended.  In 1991, further excavations were conducted in conjunction with the construction of the surrounding Futagoyama Park, resulting in the discovery of more artifacts, including more haniwa and examples of Mino ware and Sue ware pottery. Fluorescent X-ray analysis revealed that this pottery had been fired at the Shinohara ancient kiln site eight kilometers to the north. 

It is located about 10 minutes on foot from Meitetsu Johoku Line Ajiyoshi Station.

Total length 96 meters:
Anterior rectangular portion 54 meters long x 45 meters wide
Constriction width 38 meters
Posterior circular portion 48 meter diameter x 8 meters high

See also
List of Historic Sites of Japan (Aichi)

References

External links

Aichi Prefecture Cultural Properties 
Kasugai City official site

History of Aichi Prefecture
Kasugai, Aichi
Historic Sites of Japan
Archaeological sites in Japan
Kofun